The Workplace Safety and Health Act 2006 is an act issued by the Republic of Singapore. It addresses requirements for safety and health in workplaces, and replaced the Factories Act as of 1 March 2006.

The Occupational Safety and Health Framework 
The Occupational Safety and Health (OSH) framework aims to cultivate good safety habits in all individuals, so as to create a strong safety culture at the workplace.

The new framework is guided by the following principles:

 Reducing risks at the source by requiring all stakeholders to eliminate or minimise the risks they create;
 Instilling greater ownership of safety and health outcomes within the industries; and
 Preventing accidents through higher penalties for compromises in safety management.

The Workplace Safety and Health Act 
The Workplace Safety and Health Act (WSHA) is the key legislation affecting the principles of the OSH framework.

The WSHA emphasises the importance of managing Workplace Safety and Health (WSH) proactively, by requiring stakeholders to take reasonably practicable measures that ensure the safety and health of all individuals affected in the course of work.

The WSHA replaces the Factories Act. The key reforms under the WSHA include:

 Allowing for a gradual increase in scope to cover all workplaces;
 Assigning responsibilities to a range of stakeholders at the workplace along lines of control;
 Focusing more on WSH systems and outcomes;
 Providing for more effective enforcement through the issuance of "remedial orders"; and
 Providing for higher penalties for non-compliant and risk-taking behaviour, to prevent accidents at the source.

Workplace Safety and Health Act Subsidiary Legislation 

 WSH (Workplace Safety and Health Officers) Regulations 
 WSH (General Provisions) Regulations 
 WSH (Construction) Regulations 2007
 WSH (First Aid) Regulations 
 WSH (Incident Reporting) Regulations 
 WSH (Risk Management) Regulations 
 WSH (Exemption) Order 
 WSH (Composition of Offences) Regulations 
 WSH (Transitional Provision) Regulations 
 WSH (Offences and Penalties) (Subsidiary Legislation under Section 67(14)) Regulations 
 WSH (Registration of Factories) Regulations 2008
 WSH (Shipbuilding and Ship-repairing) Regulations 2008
 WSH (Workplace Safety and Health Committees) Regulations 2008
 WSH (Abrasive Blasting) Regulations 2008
 WSH (Safety and Health Management system and Auditing) Regulations 2009
 WSH (Confined Spaces) Regulations 2009 
 WSH (Noise) Regulations 2011
 WSH (Medical Examinations) Regulations 2011
 WSH (Operation of Cranes) Regulations 2011
 WSH (Scaffolds) Regulations 2011
 WSH (Work at Heights) Regulations
 WSH (Asbestos) Regulations 2014
 WSH (Explosive Powered Tools) Regulations 2009
 WSH (Design for Safety) Regulations 2015
 WSH (Major Hazards Installations) Regulations 2017

References

External links

2006 in law
Singaporean legislation
Occupational safety and health law